In functional analysis and related areas of mathematics, Fréchet spaces, named after Maurice Fréchet, are special topological vector spaces. 
They are generalizations of Banach spaces (normed vector spaces that are complete with respect to the metric induced by the norm). 
All Banach and Hilbert spaces are Fréchet spaces. 
Spaces of infinitely differentiable functions are typical examples of Fréchet spaces, many of which are typically  Banach spaces. 

Important note: Not all authors require that a Fréchet space be locally convex (discussed below). 

The topology of every Fréchet space is induced by some translation-invariant complete metric. 
Conversely, if the topology of a locally convex space  is induced by a translation-invariant complete metric then  is a Fréchet space. 

Fréchet was the first to use the term "Banach space" and Banach in turn then coined the term "Fréchet space" to mean a complete metrizable topological vector space, without the local convexity requirement (such a space is today often called an "F-space"). 
The condition of locally convex was added later by Nicolas Bourbaki. 
It's important to note that a sizable number of authors (e.g. Schaefer) use "F-space" to mean a (locally convex) Fréchet space while others do not require that a "Fréchet space" be locally convex. 
Moreover, some authors even use "F-space" and "Fréchet space" interchangeably. 
When reading mathematical literature, it is recommended that a reader always check whether the book's or article's definition of "-space" and "Fréchet space" requires local convexity.

Definitions

Fréchet spaces can be defined in two equivalent ways: the first employs a translation-invariant metric, the second a countable family of seminorms.

Invariant metric definition

A topological vector space  is a Fréchet space if and only if it satisfies the following three properties:
It is locally convex.

Note there is no natural notion of distance between two points of a Fréchet space: many different translation-invariant metrics may induce the same topology.

Countable family of seminorms definition

The alternative and somewhat more practical definition is the following: a topological vector space  is a Fréchet space if and only if it satisfies the following three properties:

 It is a Hausdorff space,
 Its topology may be induced by a countable family of seminorms   This means that a subset  is open if and only if for every  there exists  and  such that  is a subset of  
 it is complete with respect to the family of seminorms. 

A family  of seminorms on  yields a Hausdorff topology if and only if

As webbed Baire spaces

Comparison to Banach spaces

In contrast to Banach spaces, the complete translation-invariant metric need not arise from a norm. 
The topology of a Fréchet space does, however, arise from both a total paranorm and an -norm (the  stands for Fréchet). 

Even though the topological structure of Fréchet spaces is more complicated than that of Banach spaces due to the potential lack of a norm, many important results in functional analysis, like the open mapping theorem, the closed graph theorem, and the Banach–Steinhaus theorem, still hold.

Constructing Fréchet spaces

Recall that a seminorm  is a function from a vector space  to the real numbers satisfying three properties. 
For all  and all scalars 

If , then  is in fact a norm. 
However, seminorms are useful in that they enable us to construct Fréchet spaces, as follows:

Then the topology induced by these seminorms (as explained above) turns  into a Fréchet space; the first property ensures that it is Hausdorff, and the second property ensures that it is complete. 
A translation-invariant complete metric inducing the same topology on  can then be defined by

Examples

From pure functional analysis

 Every Banach space is a Fréchet space, as the norm induces a translation-invariant metric and the space is complete with respect to this metric.
 The space  of all real valued sequences becomes a Fréchet space if we define the -th seminorm of a sequence to be the absolute value of the -th element of the sequence. Convergence in this Fréchet space is equivalent to element-wise convergence.

From smooth manifolds

The vector space  of all infinitely differentiable functions  becomes a Fréchet space with the seminorms

The vector space  of all infinitely differentiable functions  becomes a Fréchet space with the seminorms

for all integers  Then, a sequence of functions  converges if and only if for every  the sequences  converge compactly.

The vector space  of all -times continuously differentiable functions  becomes a Fréchet space with the seminorms

for all integers  and 

As a special case, every smooth finite-dimensional   can be made into such a nested union of compact subsets: equip it with a Riemannian metric  which induces a metric  choose  and let

(where  is the norm induced by the Riemannian metric) is a family of seminorms making  into a Fréchet space.

From holomorphicity

Let  be the space of entire (everywhere holomorphic) functions on the complex plane.  Then the family of seminorms

makes  into a Fréchet space.

Let  be the space of entire (everywhere holomorphic) functions of exponential type   Then the family of seminorms

makes  into a Fréchet space.

Not all vector spaces with complete translation-invariant metrics are Fréchet spaces.  An example is the space  with  
Although this space fails to be locally convex, it is an F-space.

Properties and further notions

If a Fréchet space admits a continuous norm then all of the seminorms used to define it can be replaced with norms by adding this continuous norm to each of them. 
A Banach space,   with  compact, and  all admit norms, while  and  do not. 

A closed subspace of a Fréchet space is a Fréchet space. 
A quotient of a Fréchet space by a closed subspace is a Fréchet space. 
The direct sum of a finite number of Fréchet spaces is a Fréchet space. 

A product of countably many Fréchet spaces is always once again a Fréchet space. However, an arbitrary product of Fréchet spaces will be a Fréchet space if and only if all  for at most countably many of them are trivial (that is, have dimension 0). Consequently, a product of uncountably many non-trivial Fréchet spaces can not be a Fréchet space (indeed, such a product is not even metrizable because its origin can not have a countable neighborhood basis).

Several important tools of functional analysis which are based on the Baire category theorem remain true in Fréchet spaces; examples are the closed graph theorem and the open mapping theorem. 
The open mapping theorem implies that if  are topologies on  that make both  and  into complete metrizable TVSs (such as Fréchet spaces) and if one topology is finer or coarser than the other then they must be equal (that is, if ).

Every bounded linear operator from a Fréchet space into another topological vector space (TVS) is continuous. 

There exists a Fréchet space  having a bounded subset  and also a dense vector subspace  such that  is  contained in the closure (in ) of any bounded subset of  

All Fréchet spaces are stereotype spaces. In the theory of stereotype spaces Fréchet spaces are dual objects to Brauner spaces. 
All metrizable Montel spaces are separable. A separable Fréchet space is a Montel space if and only if each weak-* convergent sequence in its continuous dual converges is strongly convergent. 

The strong dual space  of a Fréchet space (and more generally, of any metrizable locally convex space)  is a DF-space. 
The strong dual of a DF-space is a Fréchet space. 
The strong dual of a reflexive Fréchet space is a bornological space and a Ptak space. Every Fréchet space is a Ptak space. 
The strong bidual (that is, the strong dual space of the strong dual space) of a metrizable locally convex space is a Fréchet space.

Norms and normability

The space of all sequences  (with the product topology) is a Fréchet space. There does not exist any Hausdorff locally convex topology on  that is strictly coarser than this product topology. 
The space  is not normable, which means that its topology can not be defined by any norm.

If  is a non-normable Fréchet space on which there exists a continuous norm, then  contains a closed vector subspace that has no topological complement. 

A metrizable locally convex space is normable if and only if its strong dual space is a Fréchet–Urysohn locally convex space. In particular, if a locally convex metrizable space  (such as a Fréchet space) is  normable (which can only happen if  is infinite dimensional) then its strong dual space  is not a Fréchet–Urysohn space and consequently, this complete Hausdorff locally convex space  is also neither metrizable nor normable.

The strong dual space of a Fréchet space (and more generally, of bornological spaces such as metrizable TVSs) is always a complete TVS and so like any complete TVS, it is normable if and only if its topology can be induced by a complete norm (that is, if and only if it can be made into a Banach space that has the same topology). 
Consequently, if a Fréchet space is  normable (which can only happen if it is infinite dimensional) then neither is its strong dual space.

Anderson–Kadec theorem

Note that the homeomorphism described in the Anderson–Kadec theorem is  necessarily linear.

Differentiation of functions

 
This is a major difference between the theory of Banach spaces and that of Fréchet spaces and necessitates a different definition for continuous differentiability of functions defined on Fréchet spaces, the Gateaux derivative:

exists. 
The map  is said to be continuously differentiable in  if the map

is continuous.

The first derivative is given by

for any two elements  
This is a major advantage of the Fréchet space  over the Banach space  for finite  

If  is a continuously differentiable function, then the differential equation

need not have any solutions, and even if does, the solutions need not be unique. This is in stark contrast to the situation in Banach spaces. 

In general, the inverse function theorem is not true in Fréchet spaces, although a partial substitute is the Nash–Moser theorem.

Fréchet manifolds and Lie groups

One may define Fréchet manifolds as spaces that "locally look like" Fréchet spaces (just like ordinary manifolds are defined as spaces that locally look like Euclidean space ), and one can then extend the concept of Lie group to these manifolds. 
This is useful because for a given (ordinary) compact  manifold  the set of all  diffeomorphisms  forms a generalized Lie group in this sense, and this Lie group captures the symmetries of  
Some of the relations between Lie algebras and Lie groups remain valid in this setting.

Another important example of a Fréchet Lie group is the loop group of a compact Lie group  the smooth mappings  multiplied pointwise by

Generalizations

If we drop the requirement for the space to be locally convex, we obtain F-spaces: vector spaces with complete translation-invariant metrics.

LF-spaces are countable inductive limits of Fréchet spaces.

See also

Notes

Citations

References

 
  
  
  
  
  
  
  
  
  
 
  
  
  
 
  
  
  
  

 
Topological vector spaces
F-spaces